Sageretia camellifolia is a shrub growing to 4m in height.  It has brown-grey branchlets with green shiny leaves.  It grows in sparse forests or thickets on top of limestone hills, and can be found in West Guangxi, China.

References
RHAMNACEAE

camellifolia
Flora of Guangxi